Richard F. Smith (born c. 1961) is an American business executive. He served as the chairman and chief executive officer of Equifax from 2005 to 2017.

Early life
Smith was born circa 1961. He graduated from Purdue University.

Career
Smith  General Electric for two decades. He served as the chairman and CEO of Equifax from 2005 to 2017, when he retired in the wake of the data breach of approximately 145.5 million customers. Because Smith retired instead of getting fired, he is expected to receive $90 million, including performance-based unvested stocks and $18.5 in retirement benefits, according to Fortune.

Smith serves on the advisory board of DocuSign.

References

External links
Richard Smith on C-SPAN

Living people
1960s births
Purdue University alumni
American chairpersons of corporations
American chief executives
General Electric employees
Equifax people